Southern Tomb 23 is a sepulchre in Amarna, Egypt. It was used for the burial of Any, whose titles included, Royal scribe, Scribe of the offering-table of the Aten, Steward of the estate of Aakheperura (Amenhotep II).

Architectural features

The entrance is not completed, but the design was meant to include a portico. This feature was meant to be executed as two separate porches on either side of the colonnaded entryway. The portal shows customary scenes showing the King and the Queen. In this case they are accompanied by three daughters. The later form of the cartouches is found on the door jambs indicating that the tomb was inscribed after year 9 of Akhenaten.

The shorter version of the Great Hymn to the Aten appears in the entrance way. The hymn is followed by the name and titles of Any. He is said to be
 The intimate of the King, whom the lord loves, the favorite whom the Lord of the Two Lands created by his bounty, who has reached the blessed reward by the favor of the King, the acting scribe of the King, beloved by him. Scribe of the Altar of the Lord of the Two Lands, Scribe of the Offering Table of the Aten in Akhetaten, Steward if the house of King Aa-kheperur-ra, Any. 

The tomb's corridor design resembles some of the northern group of tombs. It has 2 unfinished porches on either side of the door and is only basically decorated. The walls are not decorated but a colored corniche runs along the top of the wall.

The burial shaft was cut into the floor of the corridor. A door on the wall of the shaft gives access to a room that extends underneath the shrine in the tomb. The shrine contains a statue of the deceased seated on a chair. He is seated on a platform and there is a set of chairs leading up to the platform. In this case it is clearly the deceased who is venerated and not the King or some god.

Votive stelae
When the tomb was first cleared by Barsanti in 1891 six stele donated by officials and a brother of Any for the burial were discovered.

See also
Southern Tombs Cemetery

References

External links
 Tomb of Any

Amarna tombs